"I'm in Love with a German Film Star" is a post-punk song by the British band the Passions. It was released as a single by Polydor Records on 23 January 1981, and reached No. 25 on the UK Singles Chart. It was the band's only charting single. The song was later included on the band's second album, Thirty Thousand Feet Over China (1981).

The lyrics were written by the band's vocalist Barbara Gogan about Steve "Roadent" Connelly, a one-time roadie for the Clash and Sex Pistols, who had minor roles in several German films and played the Joker in the 1978 miniseries .

Cover versions
Linoleum covered the song on their second album and also released it as a single in 2000 on the Fierce Panda label.

The American rock band Foo Fighters covered "I'm in Love with a German Film Star" as the B-side to their 2005 single "Best of You". The British electronic duo Kish Mauve recorded a version for the B-side of their 2006 single "Modern Love".

It was also recorded by the American singer-songwriter Chris Whitley for his 2006 album, Reiter In.

"I'm in Love with a German Film Star" was also covered by the British artist and filmmaker Sam Taylor-Wood, who released it as a single on 20 October 2008 on the German Kompakt label. It was produced by Pet Shop Boys, who also contributed a full length "Symphonic Mix". Other remixes were provided by Gui Boratto, Mark Reeder and Jürgen Paape. The single reached No. 1 on the UK Dance Singles Charts in November 2008.

On 12 April 2010, the band Dubstar released a cover version of the song for an Amnesty International project. The track appeared on the Peace compilation, available via download.

Track listings

The Passions
All tracks written by the Passions.

7" single (POSP 222)
"I'm in Love with a German Film Star"
"(Don't Talk To Me) I'm Shy"

Linoleum
7" single (NING 093)
"I'm in Love with a German Film Star"
"Sirens"

Sam Taylor-Wood
7" single (KOMPAKT POP 13/7)
"I'm in Love with a German Film Star (Original Radio Edit)"
"I'm in Love with a German Film Star (Mark Reeder's Rundfunk Mix)"

12" single (KOMPAKT POP 13) and download
"I'm in Love with a German Film Star (Gui Boratto Mix)"
"I'm in Love with a German Film Star (PSB Symphonic Mix)"
"I'm in Love with a German Film Star (Mark Reeder's Stuck in the 80's Mix)"
"I'm in Love with a German Film Star (Jürgen Paape Mix)"

CD single (KOMPAKT POP MAXI CD 3)
"I'm in Love with a German Film Star (Original Radio Edit)"
"I'm in Love with a German Film Star (PSB Symphonic Mix)"
"I'm in Love with a German Film Star (PSB Symphonic Instrumental Mix)"
"I'm in Love with a German Film Star (Mark Reeder's Stuck in the 80's Mix)"
"I'm in Love with a German Film Star (Gui Boratto Mix)"

References

External links
The Passions
"I'm in Love with a German Film Star" at The Passions' official website

Sam Taylor-Wood

1981 songs
1981 singles
2008 singles
Post-punk songs
Polydor Records singles